The tricolored heron (Egretta tricolor), formerly known as the Louisiana heron, is a small species of heron native to coastal parts of the Americas. The species is more solitary than other species of heron in the Americas and eats a diet constiting mostly of small fish.

Habitat, breeding, and distribution
Tricolored herons breed in swamps and other coastal habitats and nests in colonies, often with other herons, usually on platforms of sticks in trees or shrubs. In each clutch, three to seven eggs are typically laid. The tricolored heron is the second most coastal heron in the United States.

The species' range follows  the northeastern United States, south along the coast, through the Gulf of Mexico and the Caribbean, to northern South America as far south as Brazil. In the Pacific region, it ranges from Peru to California, but it is only a nonbreeding visitor to the far north. 

It was likely the most numerous heron in North America until the cattle egret arrived to the continent in the 1950s. While the species' population appears to be on the decline, it remains quite common. The bird is listed as "Threatened" by the Florida Fish and Wildlife Conservation Commission.

Description
The slightly larger male heron weighs  on average, while the female averages . It is a medium-large, long-legged, long-necked heron with a long, pointed, yellowish or greyish bill with a black tip. Its legs and feet are dark. The plumage of the triclolored heron changes dramatically from its juvenile form to its adult form.

Adults have a blue-grey head, neck, back, and upper wings, with a white line along the neck. The belly is white. In breeding plumage, they have long, blue, filamentous plumes on their heads and necks, and buff ones on their backs.

Behavior and diet
The tricolored heron is more solitary when foraging than other North American herons. When it forages for its prey, mostly small fish, it is typically belly-deep in water, alone or at the edge of a mixed flock. The species also eats amphibians, crustaceans, gastropods, leeches, worms, spiders, reptiles, and insects.

Gallery

References

Further reading

External links

 Tricolored Heron - Egretta tricolor - USGS Patuxent Bird Identification InfoCenter
 Tricolored heron photos at Field Guide: Birds of the World on Flickr
 Tricolored heron Bird Sound at Florida Museum of Natural History
 
 
  

tricolored heron
Birds of the Americas
Birds of the Caribbean
Birds of the Guianas
Birds of Mexico
Birds of Panama
Birds of Colombia
Birds of Venezuela
Birds of Ecuador
Birds of Peru
Birds of Brazil
Native birds of the Southeastern United States
tricolored heron
Taxa named by Philipp Ludwig Statius Müller